Carl Gustav Calwer (11 November 1821, Stuttgart — 19 August 1874, Mineralbad Berg) was a German entomologist who specialised in Coleoptera.

He wrote initially with the Stuttgart professor Dr Gustav Jäger Käferbuch, Naturgeschichte der Käfer Europas published by Julius Hoffmann, Stuttgart a 666-page work with 50 lithographic plates all but two in colour. This very popular work was successively reprinted until 1916. Many of the fine plates were reused in Georgij Georgiewitsch Jacobson's 1905 Beetles of Russia, enabling Jacobson to focus on illustrating previously undescribed species.

References
Anonym 1874, [Calwer, C. G.] Nachr. bl. dtsch. malacol. Ges. 6: 14.
Schenkling, S. 1933, [Calwer, C. G.] Ent. Blätter Biol. Syst. Käfer 29: 26

External links

Käferbuch  Digitised

Calwer, Carl Gustav
German ornithologists
1821 births
1874 deaths
Scientists from Stuttgart